Richard Franklin Stockton (Akron, Ohio February 3, 1932 – April 5, 1997) was an American playwright. He was the first American Playwright to receive a world premiere at the Abbey Theatre, Ireland’s National Theatre, for his play Prisoner of the Crown, co-produced by Sir Alfred Drake. The play received its American premiere by the Repertory Company of the Virginia Museum Theater, under the title The Royal Rape of Ruari Macasmunde, with Keith Fowler in the title role and under Alfred Drake's direction. The play dramatizes the jury deliberations in the treason trial of Roger Casement.

He received his Bachelor's Degree at Akron University in 1954, followed by a  Master's Degree in playwriting at UCLA in 1960 and a playwriting fellowship at the State University of Iowa.

He was a speech writer for various CEOs:  Chase Manhattan Bank, J. P. Morgan, City Bank and Exxon.  Notably David Rockefeller of Chase Manhattan Bank in 1972.

He is survived by his wife, Irene Schaeffer Stockton, three children: David Stockton, Jessica Stockton Clancy and Carlisle Stockton. Followed by five grandchildren: Gray, Avalon, and Talis Stockton; and  Maya and Keira Clancy.

Works

Plays 
 Prisoner of the Crown, Abbey Theatre, Dublin, Ireland, co-produced by Sir Alfred Drake in 1972. .
 Prisoner of the Crown (as The Royal Rape of Ruari Macasmunde), the American premiere, directed by Alfred Drake, at the Virginia Museum Theater in 1972.
 Prisoner of the Crown, The Milwaukee Repertory Theater, directed by Nagle Jackson in 1973;
 Prisoner of the Crown, The Irish Repertory Theatre in New York directed by Ciaran O'Reilly in 2008.
 Speak of the Devil, produced in New York City: at the Lambs Theatre in 1972 under the title One World at a Time
 Speak of the Devil produced in New York City at The Chernuchin under the title Royal Bob in 1983 starring Larry Bryggman
 Speak of the Devil staged reading at The Players in New York City on 01/31/11.  Directed by Robert Kalfin.
 Love Among the Platypi (Bucks County Playhouse)
 Till The Day Break (Old Salem Corporation)
 The Trial of Captain John Brown, (Louisville Little Theatre)
 The House Shall Tremble (UCLA)
 The Weed Bouquet (The Playwrights Showcase in New Orleans)
 The Litter of Flowers (The Little Theatre of Jacksonville).
 Seven Short Plays (UCLA and The Tokyo English Theatre).

Books for musical adaptations of classics 
 The Adventures of Tom Sawyer (Town Hall)
 The Prince and The Pauper
  Androcles and The Lion,  produced by The National Theatre Company and toured nationally by Fran and Barry Weissler.

Numerous television dramas for CBS, The Great Adventure, CBC Television, and The U.S. Steel Hour, starring James Whitmore, Anne Baxter, Jeanne Crain, Mona Freeman, Barry Sullivan, and Jack Klugman. A dozen radio plays produced internationally for the BBC, CBC Television, and Radio New Zealand.

Awards 
Stockton received the Samuel Goldwyn Creative Writing Award for The House Shall Tremble. He also received first place awards in the Samuel French National Playwriting Competition, the Bellows Prize For Drama, and The Alden Award of the Dramatists Alliance.

References

External links 
 CurtainUp Review: Prisoner of the Crown
 NY Theater Review "Prisoner of the Crown"
 New York Theatre Guide - review of "Prisoner of the Crown"
 Irish Abroad - review of "Prisoner of the Crown"
 New Theater Corps - review of "Prisoner of the Crown"
 Variety - review of "Prisoner of the Crown"
 Chelsea Now - review of "Prisoner of the Crown"
 The New Yorker - review of "Prisoner of the Crown"

1932 births
1997 deaths
University of Akron alumni
UCLA Film School alumni
American television writers
American male television writers
20th-century American dramatists and playwrights
American male dramatists and playwrights
20th-century American male writers
20th-century American screenwriters